Le Dôme Café or Café du Dôme is a restaurant in Montparnasse, Paris that first opened in . Based on the example established by La Closerie des Lilas (created in 1847) and followed by Café de la Rotonde (created in 1911), Le Select (created in 1925), and La Coupole (created in 1927), Le Dôme was renowned as an intellectual gathering place for artists and writers during the interwar period. Le Dôme created and disseminated gossip and provided message exchanges and an 'over the table' market that dealt in artistic and literary futures. It was frequented by painters, sculptors, writers, poets, models, art connoisseurs and dealers.  

Le Dôme later became the gathering place of the American literary colony and became a focal point for artists residing in Paris's Left Bank.

A poor artist used to be able to get a Saucisse de Toulouse and a plate of mashed potatoes for $1. Today, it is a top fish restaurant (the Michelin Guide once gave it one  star), with a comfortably old-fashioned decor. The food writer Patricia Wells said, "I could dine at Le Dôme once a week, feasting on platters of briny oysters and their incomparable sole meunière."

Address 
108 bd. Montparnasse, Paris, 75014
Closest Métro: Vavin

Dômiers 
The term Dômiers was coined to refer to the international group of visual, and literary artists who gathered at the Café du Dôme, including:

 Samuel Beckett (1906–1989)
 Walter Benjamin (1892–1940)
 Thomas Hart Benton (1889–1975)
 Robert Capa (1913–1954) 
 Leonora Carrington (1917–2011)
 Henri Cartier-Bresson (1908–2004)
 Aleister Crowley (1875–1947)
 Constant Detré (1891–1945)
 Max Ernst (1891–1976)
 Leonor Fini (1907–1996)
 Ernesto de Fiori (1884–1945)
 Tsuguharu Foujita (1886–1968)
 Paul Gauguin (1848–1903)
 Ida Gerhardi (1862–1927)
 Khalil Gibran (1883–1931)
 Ernest Hemingway (1899–1961)
 Elmyr de Hory (1906–1976)
 Youssef Howayek (1883–1962) 
 Wassily Kandinsky (1866–1944)
 Moïse Kisling (1891–1953)
 Eva Kotchever (1891-1943)
 Vladimir Lenin (1870–1924)
 Sinclair Lewis (1885–1951)
 Sándor Márai (1900–1989)
 Henry Miller (1891–1980)
 Amedeo Modigliani (1884–1920)
 Anaïs Nin (1903–1977) 
 Méret Oppenheim (1913–1985)
 Jules Pascin (1885–1930)
 Pablo Picasso (1881–1973)
 Ezra Pound (1885–1972)
 Man Ray (1890–1976)
 Louis Schanker (1903–1981)
 Chaïm Soutine (1893–1943)
 Ernesto Sábato (1911–2010)
 Ré Soupault (1901–1996)
 Gerda Taro (1910–1937)
 Mika Waltari (1908–1979)

References in Literature 
 Henry Miller, Tropic of Cancer (1934)
 Elliot Paul, The Mysterious Mickey Finn: or Murder at the Cafe Du Dome (1939)
 Ernest Hemingway: references members of the Parisien literary scene meeting at the Dôme in The Torrents of Spring (1926); The Sun Also Rises (1926) and With Pascin at the Dôme in A Moveable Feast (1964)
 "Paris", lyrics by Édith Piaf
 Aleister Crowley's magical retirement frequenting Du Dome
 Simone de Beauvoir, She Came to Stay (1943)
 Jean-Paul Sartre, The Age of Reason (1947)
 Ernesto Sábato, Abaddon el Exterminador (1976)
 Anaïs Nin, Delta of Venus (1977)
 W. Somerset Maugham, The Razor's Edge (1944)

References

External links
 Restaurant le Dôme Accueil

Restaurants in Paris
Michelin Guide starred restaurants in France
Buildings and structures in the 14th arrondissement of Paris